The Petersburg Observer is a weekly newspaper based in Petersburg, Illinois founded in G. W. Cain and William Parks in 1878. Jane Cutright is the current editor. It is published every Wednesday. It has a circulation of 3,100 and is owned by the Petersburg Observer Corporation.

It has no public website.

References

Petersburg, Illinois